Bee Movie is a 2007 American computer-animated comedy film produced by DreamWorks Animation and Columbus 81 Productions, and distributed by Paramount Pictures. The film was directed by Simon J. Smith and Steve Hickner (in the former's feature directorial debut) from a screenplay by Jerry Seinfeld, Spike Feresten, Barry Marder and Andy Robin. It stars the voices of Seinfeld, Renée Zellweger, Matthew Broderick, John Goodman, Patrick Warburton, and Chris Rock. The film centers on Barry B. Benson (Seinfeld), a honey bee who tries to sue the human race for exploiting bees after learning from his new florist friend Vanessa Bloome (Zellweger) that humans sell and consume honey.

Bee Movie debuted in New York City on October 25, 2007, and was released in theaters in the United States on November 2. Upon its release, it received mixed reviews from critics, who praised its humor and voice cast, but criticized its plot. The film was a box office success, grossing $293.5 million worldwide on a budget of $150 million. It has since gathered a cult following, partly driven by memes of the film shared on social media.

Plot

Barry B. Benson, an idealistic honey bee who has the ability to talk to humans, has recently graduated from college and is about to enter the hive's Honex Industries honey-making workforce with his best friend, Adam Flayman. Barry is initially excited to join the workforce, but his ambitious, insubordinate attitude emerges upon discovering that his choice of job will never change once picked. Later, the two bees run into a group of Pollen Jocks, bees who collect pollen from flowers outside the hive, and they offer to take Barry with them if he is "bee enough". While on his first pollen-gathering expedition in New York City, Barry gets lost in the rain, and ends up on the balcony of a human florist named Vanessa Bloome. Upon noticing Barry, Vanessa's boyfriend Ken attempts to squash him, but Vanessa gently catches and releases Barry outside the window, saving his life.

Barry later returns to express his gratitude to Vanessa, breaking the sacred rule that bees are not to communicate with humans. Barry and Vanessa develop a close friendship, bordering on attraction, and spend time together. When he and Vanessa are in the grocery store, Barry discovers that the humans have been stealing and eating the bees' honey for centuries. He decides to journey to Honey Farms, which supplies the grocery store with its honey. Incredulous at the poor treatment of the bees in the hive, including the use of bee smokers to incapacitate the colony, Barry decides to sue the human race to put an end to exploitation of the bees, with Vanessa agreeing to help.

Barry's mission attracts wide attention from bees and humans alike, with countless spectators attending the trial. Although Barry is up against tough defense attorney Layton T. Montgomery, the trial's first day goes well. That evening, Barry is having dinner with Vanessa when Ken shows up. Vanessa leaves the room, and Ken expresses to Barry that he hates the pair spending time together. When Barry leaves to use the restroom, Ken ambushes Barry and attempts to kill him, only for Vanessa to intervene and break up with Ken. The second day at the trial, Montgomery unleashes an unrepentant character assassination against the bees, leading a deeply offended Adam to sting him. Montgomery immediately exaggerates the stinging to make himself seem the victim of an assault while simultaneously tarnishing Adam. Adam's actions jeopardize the bees' credibility and his life, though he recovers. The third day, Barry wins the trial by exposing the jury to the torturous treatment of bees, particularly use of the smoker, and prevents humans from stealing honey from bees ever again. Having lost the trial, Montgomery cryptically warns Barry that a negative shift of nature is imminent.

With Honex stopping honey production, every bee is put out of a job, including the vitally important Pollen Jocks, resulting in all the world's flowers beginning to die out without any pollination. Before long, the last remaining flowers on Earth are being stockpiled in Pasadena, California, intent for the last Tournament of Roses Parade. Barry and Vanessa travel to the parade and steal a float, which they load into a plane. They hope to bring the flowers to the bees so they can re-pollinate the world's last remaining flowers. When the plane's pilot and co-pilot both fall unconscious, Vanessa is forced to land the plane, with help from Barry and the bees from Barry's hive.

Barry becomes a member of the Pollen Jocks, and they fly off to a flower patch. Armed with the pollen of the last flowers, Barry and the Pollen Jocks reverse the damage and save the world's flowers, restarting the bees' honey production. Later on, Barry runs a law firm at Vanessa's flower shop titled "Insects at Law", which handles disputes between animals and humans. While selling flowers to customers, Vanessa offers certain brands of honey that are "bee-approved".

Voice cast

 Jerry Seinfeld as Barry B. Benson
 Renée Zellweger as Vanessa Bloome
 Matthew Broderick as Adam Flayman
 John Goodman as Layton T. Montgomery
 Patrick Warburton as Ken
 Chris Rock as Mooseblood the Mosquito
 Kathy Bates as Janet B. Benson
 Barry Levinson as Martin B. Benson
 Megan Mullally as Trudy, Honex Tour Guide
 Rip Torn as Pollen Jocks General Lou Lo Duca
 Oprah Winfrey as Judge Bumbleton
 Michael Richards as Bud Ditchwater
 Larry King as Bee Larry King, a fictionalized bee version of himself
 Larry Miller as Dean Buzzwell
 Jim Cummings as Title Narrator and Graduation Announcer
 David Moses Pimentel as Hector
 Chuck Martin as Andy
 Brian Hopkins as Sandy Shrimpkin and TSA Agent
 John DiMaggio as Bailiff and Janitor
 Tress MacNeille as Jeanette Chung, Mother and Cow
 Simon J. Smith as Truck Driver and Chet
 Ray Liotta as Himself
 Sting as Himself
 Robert Jayne as Bee (uncredited)
 Carl Kasell as Himself (uncredited)

Production

The development of Bee Movie began when Steven Spielberg approached DreamWorks Animation CEO and co-founder Jeffrey Katzenberg after Jerry Seinfeld asked him to make an animated film featuring insects. Production of the film began in 2003. Seinfeld spent a week in Los Angeles working on it. Teleconferencing system HP Halo was installed in Seinfeld's office in New York, enabling him to work on the film and interact between coasts. Seinfeld said he chose New York because it was "the Tigris and Euphrates of comedy" with his humor, and Katzenberg was the main reason for making the film. Overall, the budget was approximately $150million. Steven Spielberg was in two live action trailers of this film in November 2006 and early 2007 where he interacted with Seinfeld, who wore a bee costume.

Release
The 91-minute Bee Movie debuted in New York City on October 25, 2007, followed by a premiere on October 28, in Los Angeles. It was released in the United States on November 2. The film was produced by DreamWorks Animation and Columbus 81 Productions, and distributed by Paramount Pictures. Bee Movie Game was released in October 2007 for multiple platforms.

Paramount Home Entertainment released Bee Movie on DVD (single- and double-disc) on March 11, 2008, and on Blu-ray in May. The DVD extras include the "Inside the Hive: The Cast of Bee Movie" and "Tech of Bee Movie" featurettes, "We Got the Bee" music video, "Meet Barry B. Benson" feature, interactive games, a filmmaker commentary, alternate endings, lost scenes, the live-action trailers, and Jerry's Flight Over Cannes. An HD DVD version of the film was canceled after the discontinuation of that format.

Reception

Box office
Bee Movie earned $126.6million in the United States and Canada and $166.9million in other countries, for a worldwide total of $293.5million. DreamWorks Animation reported the film's net profit as $27.3million, particularly home media revenues.
 
The film was released with American Gangster and Martian Child on November 2, 2007. Bee Movie earned $10.2million on its first day. The film debuted at second earning $39.1million from 3,928 theaters. Its second weekend earnings dropped by 32 percent to $26million, and followed by another $14.3million the third weekend. Bee Movie completed its theatrical run in the United States and Canada on February 14, 2008.

Critical reception
Its critical consensus reads, "Bee Movie has humorous moments, but its awkward premise and tame delivery render it mostly forgettable." Metacritic (which uses a weighted average) assigned Bee Movie a score of 54 out of 100 based on 34 critics, indicating "mixed or average reviews". Audiences polled by CinemaScore gave the film an average grade of "B+" on an A+ to F scale.

Michael Phillips of the Chicago Tribune gave the film two and a half stars out of four, saying "It's on the easygoing level of Surf's Up, and a full tick up from, say, Over the Hedge or The Ant Bully. But given the Seinfeld pedigree it's something of a disappointment." Peter Travers of Rolling Stone gave the film three out of four stars, saying "At its relaxed best, when it's about, well, nothing, the slyly comic Bee Movie is truly beguiling." Desson Thomson of The Washington Post said, "Bee Movie feels phoned in on every level. The images, usually computer animation's biggest draw, are disappointingly average. And as for the funny stuff, well, that's where you were supposed to come in."

A. O. Scott of The New York Times gave the film three and a half stars out of four, saying "The most genuinely apian aspect of Bee Movie is that it spends a lot of its running time buzzing happily around, sniffing out fresh jokes wherever they may bloom." Claudia Puig gave the film one and a half stars out of four, saying "Bee Movie is certainly not low-budget, but it has all the staying power and creative value of a B-movie. The secret life of bees, as told by Seinfeld, is a bore with a capital B." Steven Rea of The Philadelphia Inquirer gave the film three stars out of four, saying "Bee Movie is not Shrek, and it is not Ratatouille either (by far the standout computer-animated feature of the year). But it has enough buzzing wit and eye-popping animation to win over the kids—and probably more than a few parents, too." Richard Roeper gave the film a positive review, saying "This is a beautifully animated, cleverly executed, warm and funny adventure."

Roger Ebert gave the film two out of four stars, saying "All of this material, written by Seinfeld and writers associated with his television series, tries hard, but never really takes off. We learn at the outset of the movie that bees theoretically cannot fly. Unfortunately, in the movie, that applies only to the screenplay. It is really, really, really hard to care much about a platonic romantic relationship between Renee Zellweger and a bee, although if anyone could pull it off, she could." Ty Burr of The Boston Globe gave the film three out of four stars, saying "The vibe is loose-limbed and fluky, and the gags have an extra snap that's recognizably Seinfeldian. If I believed in a sitcom afterlife, I'd swear the whole thing was cooked up by Kramer and George's dad."

Accolades
Bee Movie led the 35th Annie Awards season with five nominations (including Best Animated Feature). At the 65th Golden Globe Awards, it was nominated for Best Animated Feature Film. The 13th Critics' Choice Awards nominated the film for Best Animated Feature.

Legacy
Years after the film's release, Bee Movie had an unexpected rise in popularity as an Internet meme. In 2015, posts of the entire film screenplay spread across Facebook. In November 2016, YouTube user "Avoid at All Costs" uploaded a video The entire bee movie but every time they say bee it gets faster where the entire film sped up every time the word "bee" was used. Its popularity spawned several variants where the film (or its trailer) were edited in unusual ways. Vanity Fair later characterized the film's popularity as "totally bizarre", and later identified Jason Richards as one of the meme's larger promoters through his @Seinfeld2000 Twitter account, citing the "off-brand Pixar quality", while writer Barry Marder referred to the relationship between bees and humans. Inverse felt the film's internet popularity being helpful to millennials that saw it. By December 2012, however, these posts became so ubiquitous that it would inspire parodies. It was suggested that the spread of videos such as The entire bee movie but every time they say bee it gets faster was inspired by the preceding popularity of the "We Are Number One" memes, many of which used a similar title format of "We Are Number One but..." Seinfeld expressed no interest in making a sequel to Bee Movie through its online popularity.

Two lawsuits followed the film's release: A group of Swedish animation students, who were represented by an American attorney, sued because their concept developed in 2000, titled Beebylon, had similarities to Bee Movie. A separate suit was brought by Florida-based cosmetics company Beeceuticals over the use of their trademarked phrase "Give Bees a Chance". Both of these lawsuits were rejected.

Notes

References

External links

 
 
 
 

2000s American animated films
2000s buddy comedy films
2000s children's comedy films
2000s English-language films
2007 comedy films
2007 computer-animated films
2007 directorial debut films
2007 films
American buddy comedy films
American children's animated comedy films
American computer-animated films
Animated buddy films
Animated films about friendship
Animated films about insects
Animated films set in New York City
DreamWorks Animation animated films
Film and television memes
Film controversies
Films about bees
Films directed by Simon J. Smith
Films directed by Steve Hickner
Films involved in plagiarism controversies
Films scored by Rupert Gregson-Williams
Films set in Pasadena, California
Internet memes introduced in 2016
Paramount Pictures animated films
Paramount Pictures films